Robert Mayer – der Arzt aus Heilbronn is an East German film. It was released in 1955.

External links
 

1955 films
1950s biographical films
German biographical films
East German films
1950s German-language films
Films set in the 1830s
Films set in the 1840s
German black-and-white films
1950s German films